National Route 455 is a national highway of Japan connecting Morioka, Iwate and Iwaizumi, Iwate in Japan, with a total length of .

References

National highways in Japan
Roads in Iwate Prefecture